"Warlock" is the eighteenth episode of the second series of the 1960s cult British spy-fi television series The Avengers, starring Patrick Macnee and Honor Blackman. It was first broadcast in the Teledu Cymru region of the ITV network on Friday 25 January 1963. ABC Weekend TV, who produced the show for ITV, broadcast it the next day in its own regions. The episode was directed by Peter Hammond and written by Doreen Montgomery.

Plot
The inventor of a new type of fuel lapses into a coma. Steed discovers that the scientist had links to black magic and the occult.

Production
The episode was originally intended to introduce the Cathy Gale character. But after initial production in July 1962, the episode was revamped with various scenes reshot.

Cast
 Patrick Macnee as John Steed
 Honor Blackman as Cathy Gale
 Peter Arne as Dr. Cosmo Gallion
 John Hollis as Markel
 Pat Spencer as Julia
 Douglas Muir as One Ten
 Olive Milbourne as Mrs. Dunning 
 Alban Blakelock as Peter Neville
 Brian Vaughan as Doctor
 Gordon Gardner as Pathologist
 Philip Mosca as Mogom
 Susan Franklin as Barmaid Myrtle
 Herbert Nelson as Pasco
 Christina Ferdinando as Miss Timson

References

External links

Episode overview on The Avengers Forever! website

The Avengers (season 2) episodes
1963 British television episodes